Lars Christensen Peak, also known as Lars Christensentoppen, is the highest point at  on Peter I Island, off the coast of Antarctica.

The peak is a shield volcano. It is not known whether it is extinct or not, for the upper part is apparently unmodified by glaciation.

The peak owes its name to Lars Christensen, the shipowner of the SS Odd I, a whaler that circumnavigated the island in January 1927.

See also
 List of volcanoes in Antarctica
 List of volcanoes in Norway

References
 

Volcanoes of Antarctica
Volcanoes of the Southern Ocean
Mountains of Antarctica
Peter I Island